The Brazilian real (pl. ;  sign: R$; code: BRL) is the official currency of Brazil. It is subdivided into 100 centavos. The Central Bank of Brazil is the central bank and the issuing authority. The real replaced the cruzeiro real in 1994.

As of April 2019, the real was the twentieth most traded currency.

History
Currencies in use before the current real include:
 The Portuguese real from the 16th to 18th centuries, with 1,000 réis called the milréis.
 The old Brazilian real from 1747 to 1942, with 1,000 réis also called the milréis.
 The first cruzeiro from 1942 to 1967, at 1 cruzeiro = 1 milréis or 1,000 réis.
 The cruzeiro novo from 1967 to 1970, at 1 cruzeiro novo = 1,000 first cruzeiros. From 1970 it was simply called the (second) cruzeiro and was used until 1986.
 The cruzado from 1986 to 1989, at 1 cruzado = 1,000 second cruzeiros.
 The cruzado novo from 1989 to 1990, at 1 cruzado novo = 1,000 cruzados. From 1990, because of the Plano Collor it was renamed the (third) cruzeiro and was used until 1993.
 The cruzeiro real (CR$) from 1993 to 1994, at 1 cruzeiro real = 1,000 third cruzeiros.

The current real was introduced in 1994 at 1 real = 2,750 cruzeiros reais.

The modern real (Portuguese plural reais or English plural reals) was introduced on 1 July 1994, during the presidency of Itamar Franco, when Rubens Ricupero was the Minister of Finance as part of a broader plan to stabilize the Brazilian economy, known as the Plano Real. The new currency replaced the short-lived cruzeiro real (CR$). The reform included the demonetisation of the cruzeiro real and required a massive banknote replacement.

At its introduction, the real was defined to be equal to 1 unidade real de valor (URV, "real value unit") a non-circulating currency unit. At the same time the URV was defined to be worth 2,750 cruzeiros reais, which was the average exchange rate of the U.S. dollar to the cruzeiro real on that day. As a consequence, the real was worth exactly one U.S. dollar as it was introduced. Combined with all previous currency changes in the country's history, this reform made the new real equal to 2.75 × 1018 (2.75 quintillion) of Brazil's original réis.

Soon after its introduction, the real unexpectedly gained value against the U.S. dollar, due to large capital inflows in late 1994 and 1995. During that period it attained its maximum dollar value ever, about =. Between 1996 and 1998 the exchange rate was tightly controlled by the Central Bank of Brazil, so that the real depreciated slowly and smoothly in relation to the dollar, dropping from near = to about = by the end of 1998. In January 1999 the deterioration of the international markets, disrupted by the Russian default, forced the Central Bank, under its new president Arminio Fraga, to float the exchange rate. This decision produced a major devaluation, to a rate of almost =.

In the following years, the currency's value against the dollar followed an erratic but mostly downwards path from 1999 until late 2002, when the prospect of the election of leftist candidate Luiz Inácio Lula da Silva, considered a radical populist by sectors of the financial markets, prompted another currency crisis and a spike in inflation.  Many Brazilians feared another default on government debts or a resumption of heterodox economic policies, and rushed to exchange their reais into tangible assets or foreign currencies.

The crisis subsided once Lula took office, after he, his finance minister Antonio Palocci, and Arminio Fraga reaffirmed their intention to continue the orthodox macroeconomic policies of his predecessor (including inflation-targeting, primary fiscal surplus and floating exchange rate, as well as continued payments of the public debt). The value of the real in dollars continued to fluctuate but generally upwards, so that by 2005 the exchange was a little over =. In May 2007, for the first time since 2001 (six years), the real became worth more than  — even though the Central Bank, concerned about its effect on the Brazilian economy, had tried to keep it below that symbolic threshold. Lula started his government in 01/01/2003 with an exchange rate of = and finished it in 12/31/2010 with an exchange rate of =.

The exchange rate as of September 2015 was =. After a period of gradual recovery, it reached = by February 2017.

Jair Bolsonaro's tenure, initially welcomed with enthusiasm by the financial markets, started with =. Fueled by meager results of the economy, quick disenchantment followed, resulting in lack of foreign investments and real's strong depreciation. On 13 May 2020, during the COVID-19 pandemic, which deeply affected Brazil, the real reached a historical low against the US dollar, being negotiated at =.

Following Lula's reelection in the 2022 general elections, the market, which was expected to have reacted poorly, turned out favorable in the first week. The US dollar exchange hit its lowest point since 29 August 2022, dropping from roughly = immediately before the second round of the election, to about = a week after Lula's win.

Coins

First series (1994–1997)
Along with the first series of currency, coins were introduced in denominations of 1, 5, 10 and 50 centavos and 1 real on 30 June 1994; the 25 centavos piece was soon followed on 30 September 1994 due to the constant lack of change in intermediate values ​​in the centavos range, which caused the validity of the old Cruzeiro and Cruzeiro Real banknotes to be extended for two months beyond what was initially intended for the exchange of banknotes and coins until then in circulation for new ones in the pattern that began to circulate in the second half of 1994. All were struck in stainless steel.

The coins issued in 1994 are identical in size and weight to the older cruzeiro real coins, save for the 1-centavo piece which corresponded to the even older 1000-cruzeiro coin, as no CR$1 coin was made. This influenced the replacement of this family with a newer one in 1998.

The original 1-real coins, produced only in 1994, were demonetized on 23 December 2003 due to how often it was counterfeited. All other coins remain legal tender.

Commemorative coins

In 1995, to commemorate the 50th anniversary of the Food and Agriculture Organization, the Central Bank of Brazil released two commemorative variants of the 10 and 25 centavos coins.

Additionally, non-circulating commemorative coins have also been minted, with non-standard face values – namely R$2, R$3, R$4 and R$20 coins. Although worth more than their face value to collectors, they are nevertheless legal tender.

Second series (1998–present)

In 1998, a second series of coins was introduced. It featured copper-plated steel coins of 1 and 5 centavos, bronze-plated steel 10 and 25 centavos, cupronickel 50 centavos coin, and a bimetallic nickel-brass and cupronickel coin of 1 real. In 2002 cupronickel was replaced with stainless steel for the 50-centavo coin and the central part of the 1-real coin, and the nickel-brass ring was changed to a bronze-plated steel one.

In November 2005, the Central Bank discontinued the production of the 1 centavo coins, but the existing ones continue to be legal tender. Retailers now generally round their prices to the next 5 or 10 centavos.

In November 2019, the Central Bank had the Royal Dutch Mint produce 5 centavos and 50 centavos coins, which have a distinctive letter "A" to indicate they weren't minted by Casa da Moeda.

Commemorative coins

On occasion, the Central Bank of Brazil has issued special commemorative versions of some of the standard coins. These commemorative coins are legal tender, and usually differ from the standard design only on their reverse side.

Similarly to the first series, non-circulating commemorative coins have also been minted, with the following non-standard face values: R$2, R$5, R$10 and R$20 coins. Likewise, even if they are worth more than their face value to collectors, they are nevertheless legal tender.

There were 18 types of non-circulating commemorative coins released from 2000 through 2009:

From 2010 through 2019, 15 types of non-circulating commemorative coins were released:

Since 2020, 2 types of non-circulating commemorative coins were released:

Trial strike controversy 

In 2011, a collector named Pedro Pinto Balsemão claimed to have found a trial strike of the R$1, with a never before seen design, completely different from circulating 1 real coins. Despite the initial skepticism, it was later supposedly confirmed via  requests and interviews that Casa da Moeda do Brasil had minted trial strikes of the R$1 coin prior to the currency design change in 1998, with custom designs that were purposefully different to the final product as to avoid leaks.

In May 2021, however, Bentes Group published an explanation as to why the "Real Bromélia" was not included in their Brazilian coins catalog. They claim to have done extensive research into the piece, and to have concluded that it is not a trial strike or test coin, but instead a sort of vending machine token with no numismatic value.

Banknotes

First series (1994–2010)

In 1994, banknotes print "A" were issued by Casa da Moeda do Brasil in the amounts of 1, 5, 10, 50 and 100 reais, in addition to supplementary issues of banknotes ordered abroad in the values of 5, 10 and 50 reais of the print "B" produced abroad by the companies Giesecke+Devrient, Thomas de la Rue and François-Charles Oberthur Fiduciaire respectively. In 1997, modified banknotes of 1 real (print "B"), 5 and 10 reais (print "C") were launched, bearing the national flag as a watermark instead of the effigy of the republic in order to reduce the risk of such banknotes being used for counterfeiting banknotes at higher denominations.
In 2000, the 10 reais commemorative banknote (print "D") was launched, and this banknote was the first polymer banknote to be issued in the country. In 2000 and 2001, the 2 and 20 reais banknotes were launched, respectively, using the sea turtle and the golden lion tamarin in the watermark and theme, and the 20 reais banknote was the first to make use of holographic elements on the Brazilian banknotes.
In 2003, the print "C" of the 1 real banknote was put into circulation, which would have the name "República Federativa do Brasil" at the top in the place where the name "Banco Central do Brasil" was customarily placed, which was placed on the under the obverse of the bill, next to the word real. Such banknote ceased to be issued in 2005.

Commemorative banknotes

In April 2000, in commemoration of the 500th anniversary of the Portuguese arrival on Brazilian shores, the Brazilian Central Bank released a polymer 10 real banknote that circulated along with the other banknotes above. The Brazilian Mint printed 250 million of these notes, which at the time accounted for about half of the 10 real banknotes in circulation.

Second series (2010–present)

On 3 February 2010, the Central Bank of Brazil announced the new series of the real banknotes which would begin to be released in April 2010. The new design added security enhancements in an attempt to reduce counterfeiting. The notes have different sizes according to their values to help vision-impaired people. The changes were made reflecting the growth of the Brazilian economy and the need for a stronger and safer currency. The new banknotes began to enter circulation in December 2010, coexisting with the older ones. On 29 July 2020, the Central Bank of Brazil announced the release of the 200 reais banknote. It was released into circulation on 2 September 2020.

Exchange rates

Current exchange rates

Historical exchange rate

See also
 Central Bank of Brazil
 Economy of Brazil
 Plano Real
 Portuguese real

Notes

References

External links

 Brazil's Currency War
 Images of historic and modern Brazilian bank notes
 "The Invention of the Real"—This American Life
 Historical banknotes of Brazil

Circulating currencies
Currencies introduced in 1994
Currencies of Brazil
Currencies of South America
Currency symbols